Paul Dike   (born 1950) is a retired air chief marshal of the Nigerian Air Force, who was the Chief of the Air Staff from 2006 to 2008.  In August 2008, he was appointed Chief of the Defence Staff. Prior to his appointment as Chief of the Air Staff, Dike was Air Officer Commanding Tactical Air Command. Appointed Commander of the Presidential Air Fleet in 1997 by military dictator General Sani Abacha, he was appointed Chief of Air Staff by General Olusegun Obasanjo's civilian government in 2006.

Promotions

 Officer Cadet, Nigerian Defence Academy, 22 January 1973.
 Commissioned Pilot Officer, Nigerian Air Force, 21 June 1975.
 Flying Officer, 22 January 1977
 Flight Lieutenant, 22 January 1981
 Squadron Leader, 22 July 1985
 Wing Commander, 22 January 1991
 Group Captain, 22 January 1996
 Air Commodore, 22 January 2001
 Air Vice Marshal, 22 January 2004
 Air Marshal, 30 May 2006, made CAS the same day.
Air Chief Marshal, 20 August 2008

Appointments and positions held
ACM Paul Dike held the following office prior to becoming Chief of Defence Staffs

 Staff Officer I, Operations Headquarters, Tactical Air Command
 Instructor Pilot, Operational Conversion Unit, MiG-21 fighter jets
 Chief Flying Instructor, 303 Flying Training School, FTS.
 Commander, ECOMOG Air Detachment, Freetown, Sierra Leone
 Directing Staff, Armed Forces Command and Staff College, Jaji, Kaduna.
 Commander, National Air Defence Corps.
 Deputy Director, Plans, Nigerian Air Force Headquarters.
 Director of Operations, Nigerian Air Force Headquarters.
 Commander, Nigerian Air Force Station, Yola, Adamawa State.
 Airport Commandant, Murtala Muhammed International Airport, Lagos.
 Appointed Commander, the Nigerian Presidential Air Fleet, PAF by the late General Sani Abacha
 Air Officer Commanding (AOC), Training Command, Kaduna.
 Air Officer Commanding (AOC), Makurdi, Benue State.
 Appointed the 15th Chief of Air Staff (CAS) on 1 June 2006 by former President Olusegun Obasanjo.
 Appointed the Chief of Defence Staff, Defence Headquarters, Abuja on 20 August 2008 by President Umaru Musa Yar’adua. On 8 September 2010, thereby becoming the First Nigerian Airforce officer to attain the Rank of Air Chief Marshal

References 

Max Siollun - Air Chief Marshal Paul Dike

 

 

Nigerian Air Force air marshals
Living people
People from Delta State
Chiefs of the Air Staff (Nigeria)
1950 births